Melanthius was an ancient Greek painter of the 4th century BC. He belonged to the school of Sicyon, which was noted for fine drawing.

References

Ancient Greek painters
4th-century BC Greek people
4th-century BC painters